The  is a professional wrestling championship owned and promoted by the New Japan Pro-Wrestling (NJPW) promotion. The title was officially announced on April 2, 2021. The title is exclusively featured on NJPW's American television program NJPW Strong, which includes American wrestlers. The inaugural champion was Tom Lawlor. The current champion is Kenta, who is in his first reign.

Title history

Inaugural tournament

Reigns
Tom Lawlor was the inaugural champion. Fred Rosser is the oldest champion when he won it at 38 years old while Lawlor is the youngest champion at 37 years old.

Kenta is the current champion in his first reign. He defeated Fred Rosser at Battle in the Valley on February 18, 2023, in San Jose, California.

See also

Strong Openweight Tag Team Championship
Professional wrestling in the United States

References

External links
Championship history on official website 
Championship history on official website 

Openweight wrestling championships
New Japan Pro-Wrestling championships
United States professional wrestling championships